Makaryevka is a rural locality (a selo) and the administrative center of Makaryevsky Selsoviet, Topchikhinsky District, Altai Krai, Russia. The population was 482 as of 2013. There are 10 streets.

Geography 
Makaryevka is located 8 km northwest of Topchikha (the district's administrative centre) by road. Mikhaylovka is the nearest rural locality.

References 

Rural localities in Topchikhinsky District